Events in the year 2019 in Mauritania.

Incumbents
President: Mohamed Ould Abdel Aziz (until 1 August), Mohamed Ould Ghazouani (starting 1 August)
Prime Minister: Mohamed Salem Ould Béchir (until 1 August), Ismail Ould Bedde Ould Cheikh Sidiya (starting 1 August)

Events
22 June – Scheduled date for the 2019 Mauritanian presidential election

Deaths

2 March – Med Hondo, film director, screenwriter and actor (b. 1936).

16 March – Mohamed Mahmoud Ould Louly, military officer and politician, President of Mauritania and Chairman of the Military Committee for National Salvation (b. 1943).

References

 
2010s in Mauritania
Years of the 21st century in Mauritania
Mauritania
Mauritania